Government of Felipe González may refer to:

First government of Felipe González (1982–1986)
Second government of Felipe González (1986–1989)
Third government of Felipe González (1989–1993)
Fourth government of Felipe González (1993–1996)